USS Gulfport has been the name of two ships in the United States Navy.

 was a German vessel that was seized by the United States upon its entrance into World War I.
, a Tacoma-class frigate.

United States Navy ship names